The 2011 Nile Basin Tournament was an association football tournament organized by the Egyptian Football Association. The tournament was contested in January 2011.

All fixtures are listed on FIFA.com with a 'Friendly' weight status which means that results will affect the participating nations' FIFA World Rankings.

Participants

   (host)

   
 (withdrew)
  

Sudan requested not to be drawn with Uganda as they have been drawn against each other in the 2011 African Championship of Nations tournament.

Matches

Teams finishing in 1st and 2nd position will qualify for semi-final stage whilst team that finishes in 3rd position will qualify for 5th place play-off.

Group stage

Tie-breaking criteria
If two or more teams end the group stage with the same number of points, their ranking is determined by the following criteria:
 points earned in the matches between the teams concerned;
 goal difference in the matches between the teams concerned;
 number of goals scored in the matches between the teams concerned;
 goal difference in all group matches;
 number of goals scored in all group matches;
 fair play points system taking into account the number of yellow and red cards;
 drawing of lots by the organising committee.

Group A

All times are Egypt Standard Time is at UTC+2.

Group B

Knockout stage

Semi-final

5th Place Playoff

3rd Place Playoff

Final

Winner

Prize money

Awards
Best player: Ahmed Samir Farag
Top scorer:  Al-Sayed Hamdy
Best Goalkeeper: Muteba Kidiaba
Fair Play:

Scorers

6 goals
 Al-Sayed Hamdy

3 goals
 Ahmad Belal
 Geddo

2 goals
 Lofo Bongeli
 Ahmed Ali

1 goal
 Habarugira
 Tambwe Hamisi
 Kasongo
 Matondo Salakiaku 
 AbouTrika
 Gomaa
 Okoth
 Kevin Omondi
 Ala'a Eldin Yousif
 Haitham Mustafa 
 Muhannad Tahir

1 goal
 A. Machupa
 Gumbo
 Shadrack Nsajigwa
 Kasule
 Kaweesa
 Kofoma 
 Manoya
 Ssemakula
 Y. Mugalu

Own goal
 Haroub

Media Coverage
Nile Sport
Modern Sport

References

External links
2011 Nile Basin Tournament at SoccerWay
 at goalzz.com
 at kooora.com

Nile basin
Nile Basin Tournament, 2011
International association football competitions hosted by Egypt
2010–11 in Egyptian football